Pegnitz may refer to:
 Pegnitz (river) in Germany
 Pegnitz (town), a town in Germany